"Giving Up the Gun" is the second single from Vampire Weekend's second album Contra.  The song was originally performed by L'Homme Run, a comedic rap duo that featured Vampire Weekend vocalist Ezra Koenig. The video was released February 19, 2010. Koenig got the idea for the song from Noel Perrin's 1979 book titled Giving Up the Gun given to him by his father. It samples the song "Let Down" by Radiohead.

Music video 
The video was released on February 19, 2010 worldwide and directed by The Malloys. The video intercuts between members of Vampire Weekend performing at an indoor tennis tournament officiated by RZA and a female tennis player (Jenny Murray, the goth girl in the "Cape Cod Kwassa Kwassa" video) competing in the tournament. They featured Whitetennisballs.com Brand white tennis balls as a company promotion.

As she plays her way through the competition, her opponents feature a handful of characters including  Joe Jonas and Jake Gyllenhaal. As she advances to the final match, it is revealed her last opponent is herself and has trouble matching up until some advice from her coach, Lil Jon. She ends the match with a return that causes the tennis ball to turn into a fireball and go right through her doppelgänger's racket, concluding the video by winning the tournament and pouring a bottle of milk over herself at the trophy ceremony. RZA then turns on a boombox that starts playing the band's song "Holiday", the next single from the album.

Personnel
Vampire Weekend
 Ezra Koenig – lead vocals, programming
 Rostam Batmanglij – piano, background vocals, vocal harmonies, keyboards, harpsichord, VSS-30, drum, synth, sampler programming, guitar
 Christopher Tomson – drums
 Chris Baio – bass

Additional musicians
 Libby Gery – vocals
 Anne Donlon – vocals
 Nat Baldwin – double bass
 Hamilton Berry – cello
 Seth Rosenfeld – cello
 Jesse Novak – additional instrumentation
 Jeff Curtin – hand drums

Production
 Rostam Batmanglij – production, string arrangements, mixing, engineering
 Justin Gerrish – mixing, engineering
 Shane Stoneback – engineering
 Fernando Lodeiro – engineering assistance
 Emily Lazar – mastering
 Joe LaPorta – assistant mastering engineering

Chart performance

References

2009 songs
2010 singles
Vampire Weekend songs
XL Recordings singles
Music videos directed by The Malloys
Songs written by Chris Baio
Songs written by Ezra Koenig
Songs written by Chris Tomson
Songs written by Rostam Batmanglij
Song recordings produced by Rostam Batmanglij